John Sherrill may refer to:
 John Lewis Sherrill, Christian writer
 John Scott Sherrill, American songwriter

See also
 John Sherrill Houser, American painter and sculptor